Onur Kaya (born 20 April 1986) is a Belgian professional footballer of Turkish descent who plays as an attacking midfielder for FC Kosova Schaerbeek.

Career
Kaya, who has dual Belgian-Turkish nationality, was born and raised in Brussels, but moved to the youth academy of Dutch Eredivisie club Vitesse in 2002. There, he made his professional debut on 11 February 2006 in the away game against Heerenveen. In May 2006, a few months after his debut, Kaya signed a contract four-year contract extension with Vitesse until the summer of 2010. He played a key role for the team in the following years alongside Mads Junker, Theo Janssen and Ruud Knol. However, in the 2007–08 and 2008–09 seasons, Kaya was mainly used as a substitute. In the 2009–10 season, he scored twice in the away match against Heracles Almelo and thus won a starting spot in the next games.

Before the start of the 2010–11 season, Kaya moved to Charleroi. He immediately suffered relegation to the Belgian Second Division with the club in his first season. After one season in the second tier, Charleroi immediately promoted back to the Belgian First Division A. In the 2012–13 season, he grew out to become the main force in midfield for the club.

In January 2014, Kaya signed with Lokeren. There, however, manager Peter Maes preferred other players in midfield and, partly due to the emerging talent Hans Vanaken, Kaya never won a place in the starting eleven.

On 8 January 2015, he signed a two-and-a-half-year contract with Zulte Waregem. On 18 March 2017, the club won the Belgian Cup, beating Oostende in the final. A penalty shootout after a match with extra time (2–2 after regular time, 3–3 after 120 min) resulted in the second cup win in club history. With this result, Zulte Waregem qualified for the group stage of the UEFA Europa League. There, Kaya played his former team Vitesse.

On 24 July 2018, Kaya joined Mechelen on a three-year deal after four seasons with Zulte Waregem. He grew into a team captain at the club.

On 24 August 2022, Kaya came out of retirement and joined FC Kosova Schaerbeek in the Belgian sixth tier league.

Career statistics

International career
Kaya was a youth international for Belgium, at the U19 level.

Honours
Lokeren
Belgian Cup: 2013–14

Zulte Waregem
Belgian Cup: 2016-17

References

External links
 
 

1986 births
Living people
Belgian footballers
Belgium youth international footballers
Belgian people of Turkish descent
SBV Vitesse players
R. Charleroi S.C. players
K.S.C. Lokeren Oost-Vlaanderen players
S.V. Zulte Waregem players
Eredivisie players
Belgian Pro League players
Challenger Pro League players
Belgian expatriate footballers
Expatriate footballers in the Netherlands
Belgian expatriate sportspeople in the Netherlands
Footballers from Brussels
Association football midfielders